The 2019 1,000 Miles of Sebring was an Endurance sportscar racing event held on the 15th of March 2019, as the sixth round of the 2018-19 FIA World Endurance Championship. This was the inaugural running of the race, a 268-lap event, and the first FIA WEC race to be held at Sebring International Raceway since the 2012 12 Hours of Sebring.

Background 

The provisional calendar for the 2018-19 FIA World Endurance Championship, released on the 1st of September 2017 saw a raft of changes, with several races dropped, but included a return to Sebring for the first time since 2012.  In the provisional calendar issued, the race was originally planned to be run as a second 12-hour race after the IMSA Mobil 1 12 Hours of Sebring on the same weekend, and would start at midnight after the conclusion of the IMSA 12 hours. On 21 September 2017, the race became known as the 1500 Miles of Sebring, to avoid confusion between the 2 events, at the FIA World Motor Sport Council meeting in Paris. However, on 4 April 2018, it was announced that the race would become shortened to 1000 Miles or 268 laps, have a time limit of 8 Hours, and would take place on March 15 instead, prior to the start of the 12 Hours of Sebring, rather than after the race. In addition, it was also announced that there would be a new pitlane built to accommodate the WEC teams, located on the Ulman Straight.

Entry list 
The entry list released on the 8th of February 2019 saw a number of changes, with the #4 ByKolles Racing Team ENSO CLM P1/01 removed, after the team announced they would not compete due to an engine supply dispute with NISMO, and an additional Entry from the Corvette Racing team. Nathanael Berthon was added to the #3 Rebellion Racing Rebellion R13, while Mathias Beche moved to the #1, replacing Andre Lotterer, who was unable to attend due to a clashing simulator test for the DS Techeetah Formula E team. Jenson Button and Matevos Isaakyan were replaced in the #11 and #17 SMP Racing BR Engineering BR1s by Brendon Hartley and Sergey Sirotkin respectively.

Qualifying

Qualifying Results
Pole position winners in each class are marked in bold

 – Stephane Sarrazin had his best lap time deleted for ignoring blue flags.
 – Thomas Flohr and Motoaki Ishakawa both had their fastest lap times deleted for speeding under the red flag.
 – Only one driver of the No. 61 Clearwater Racing set a lap time.
 – The No. 61 Clearwater Racing withdrew due to Perez-Companc's crash in qualifying.
 – Michael Wainwright had his fastest lap time deleted for speeding under the red flag, resulting in only one driver of the No. 86 Gulf Racing UK being classified as setting a lap time.
 – All of 's and Nyck de Vries' lap times were deleted for speeding in the pit lane, resulting in the No. 29 Racing Team Nederland having no times.

Race

Race Result
The minimum number of laps for classification (70% of the overall winning car's distance was 178 laps. Class winners are in bold.

Standings after the race

2018–2019 LMP World Endurance Drivers' Championship

2018–2019 LMP1 World Endurance Championship

 Note: Only the top five positions are included for the Drivers' Championship standings.

2018–2019 World Endurance GTE Drivers' Championship

2018–2019 World Endurance GTE Manufacturers' Championship

 Note: Only the top five positions are included for the Drivers' Championship standings.

References

External links
 

1000 Miles of Sebring
2018–19 FIA World Endurance Championship season
2019 in sports in Florida
2019 in American motorsport
March 2019 sports events in the United States